Montcin Verniel Hodge (born 29 September 1987) is an Anguillian cricketer and current member of the Leeward Islands cricket team.

Playing career
After making his Twenty20 debut for Anguilla in 2006, Hodge made his first class cricket debut for the Leeward Islands cricket team in January 2008. In 2013, Hodge was included in the Antigua Hawksbills squad for the inaugural season of the Twenty20 Caribbean Premier League.

In the 2018-19 Regional Four Day Competition, he was the leading run-scorer for the Leeward Islands team, and 2nd highest in the competition, behind only Devon Smith; He scored a career-best 158 that season against Trinidad and Tobago, and followed up with 77 not out in the 2nd innings.

References

1987 births
Living people
Anguillan cricketers
Antigua Hawksbills cricketers
Leeward Islands cricketers